Greyhound Stadium, built in 2016, is an artificial surface stadium located in Portales, New Mexico. It is home of the NCAA Division II Eastern New Mexico Greyhounds football, men's and women's soccer and men's and women's track and field teams. The stadium seats 6,100 people, but has a standard capacity of 5,200.

The stadium was relocated on campus, replacing the previous structure near Blackwater Draw in Roosevelt County built in 1969 and opened for the start of the 2016 season. The soccer teams and track and field teams moved to the facility following the renovation. The soccer teams previously played at ENMU Soccer Field and the track and field teams previously hosted home meets at ENMU Track.

References

American football venues in New Mexico
Athletics (track and field) venues in New Mexico
College football venues
College soccer venues in the United States
College track and field venues in the United States
Eastern New Mexico Greyhounds
Eastern New Mexico Greyhounds football
High school football venues in the United States
Soccer venues in New Mexico
1969 establishments in New Mexico
Sports venues completed in 1969
Buildings and structures in Roosevelt County, New Mexico